Missing is a 2008 Hong Kong dramatic fantasy horror film directed by Tsui Hark starring Angelica Lee.

Plot
Psychiatrist Dr. Gao Jing is scuba diving with a group of environmentalists attempting to bury carbon dioxide in the seabed when she is photographed by Guo Dong, the brother of her patient Xiao Kai. The photographs are shown in an exhibition and the two begin dating. Guo Dong takes Gao Jing to the Ryukyu Islands to show her the ancient underwater city of Yonaguni where he has hidden a ring that he will use to propose to his true love, but is beheaded in a mysterious accident.

Xiao Kai does not believe that the body at the funeral is her brother's because there is no head and the fingerprints have worn off. She believes that her brother may still be alive and begins searching for him. She searches a shipwreck site with Guo Dong's friend Haiya Amu and finds a white-haired severed head that she believes to be her brother's.

Dr. Gao has lost her memory of the events and does not know what happened to her boyfriend. Dr. Gao convinces her boss Dr. Tang to give her hypnotism therapy and drugs to recover her memory. The drugs cause her to develop a sensitivity to bright lights and loud noises. She notices the same sensitivity in her patient Simon, who says he has seen the dripping wet ghost of Guo Dong. Dr. Gao asks Simon to help her contact Guo Dong but warns her that she is being pursued by the white-haired ghost.

Dr. Gao returns home to finds Xiao Kai speaking with a different accent and suspects that she is channeling the ghost of Su Zhenjing, a 24-year-old girl from Hualien. Xiao Kai asks Dr. Gao to open the canister containing the recovered head but Simon calls and warns her not to do it. Later he is severely injured when he is run over by Xiao Kai and ends up in the hospital.

Dr. Gao sends Haiya Amu to check whose head is in the canister but when she returns home she finds him dead with a knife in his back. Dr. Gao throws the severed head off her balcony and is attacked by Xiao Kai, who is stopped by the police. Dr. Gao takes more of the drugs to communicate with the ghost of Guo Dong, who saves her when she almost falls down the stairs. Guo Dong's ghost explains that his oxygen tank was smashed by currents and Dr. Gao invites him to stay with her. Dr. Gao returns Haiya Amu's head to her father and has a final conversation with Guo Dong.

Dr. Gao wakes up in a hospital, where she has been ever since her boyfriend's disappearance. She has no memory of the disappearance. Xiao Kai recounts how Guo Dong disappeared after saving Dr. Gao from nitrogen narcosis. A camcorder video reveals that Dr. Gao stabbed Guo Dong during her narcosis. Xiao Kai brings Dr. Gao home and cares for her. Dr. Gao dreams that Guo Done asks her to travel to Feng Lai to find him. Dr. Gao finds the tape but the stabbing has been erased. Dr. Gao travels to Feng Lai and finds Guo Dong's cabin and lost photographs. On the beach she finds the ring he meant to give her, then she walks into the ocean. In the final scene the ghosts of Gao Jin and Guo Dong are shown swimming together around the underwater city of Yonaguni.

Cast

Production
Underwater photography was used in order to film underwater scenes off Yonaguni Island, Japan.

Release and promotion
The film was released in Hong Kong on 12 June 2008 and featured at the 2008 Rome Film Festival.

Reception
The film received generally negative reviews. Derek Elley of Variety.com called it "Tsui's career nadir" and The Hollywood Reporter called it "quite a messy piece of work" and a "hodge-podge of genres", concluding that "the whole thing looks quickly shot and put together, from the unexceptional underwater scenes to an oft-repeated theme song about undying love." A review on the website Screen Anarchy states that "the idea is intriguing" but that the film has "too many ingredients." Ho Yi of the Taipei Times wrote that "though the effort involved is commendable, the results are not".

References

External links
 
 

2008 films
Hong Kong fantasy films
Hong Kong ghost films
Hong Kong supernatural horror films
2008 fantasy films
2000s ghost films
2008 horror films
Films directed by Tsui Hark
Films shot in Japan
Dark fantasy films
2000s Hong Kong films